Flashbulb may refer to:

Flash (photography)#Flashbulbs
Flashbulb memory, a vivid memory of an event
The Flashbulb, a pseudonym of musician Benn Jordan